Macauley Appah (born 1 October 1960) is a Nigerian wrestler. He competed in the men's freestyle 90 kg at the 1984 Summer Olympics.

References

External links

1960 births
Living people
Nigerian male sport wrestlers
Olympic wrestlers of Nigeria
Wrestlers at the 1984 Summer Olympics
Place of birth missing (living people)
20th-century Nigerian people